Elkins is a city in Washington County, Arkansas, United States. The community is located in the Boston Mountains, deep in the Ozark Mountains. A combination of the former unincorporated communities of Harris and Hood, Elkins was established in 1964. Located immediately east of Fayetteville in the Northwest Arkansas metropolitan statistical area, Elkins has been experiencing rapid growth in recent years, doubling in population between the 2000 and 2010 censuses.

Geography
The city is located southeast of Fayetteville along Arkansas Highway 16 on the west bank of the White River.

Demographics

2020 census

As of the 2020 United States census, there were 3,602 people, 1,109 households, and 771 families residing in the city.

2000 census

As of the census of 2000, there were 1,251 people, 485 households, and 370 families residing in the city. The racial makeup of the city was 96.56% White, 0.16% Black or African American, 1.76% Native American, 0.24% Asian, 0.08% Pacific Islander, 0.16% from other races, and 1.04% from two or more races.  1.20% of the population were Hispanic or Latino of any race.

There were 485 households, out of which 37.7% had children under the age of 18 living with them, 65.4% were married couples living together, 9.3% had a female householder with no husband present, and 23.7% were non-families. 21.0% of all households were made up of individuals, and 10.7% had someone living alone who was 65 years of age or older.  The average household size was 2.58 and the average family size was 2.98.

In the city, the population was spread out, with 26.5% under the age of 18, 8.2% from 18 to 24, 32.7% from 25 to 44, 20.4% from 45 to 64, and 12.2% who were 65 years of age or older.  The median age was 34 years. For every 100 females, there were 98.6 males.  For every 100 females age 18 and over, there were 93.1 males.

The median income for a household in the city was $39,318, and the median income for a family was $45,750. Males had a median income of $31,742 versus $22,008 for females. The per capita income for the city was $17,161.  About 5.9% of families and 6.5% of the population were below the poverty line, including 3.9% of those under age 18 and 19.1% of those age 65 or over.

Education 
Public education for students in kindergarten through grade 12 in most of Elkins is provided by the Elkins School District, which leads to graduation at Elkins High School.

Sections of Elkins are in the Fayetteville School District. Fayetteville High School is that district's comprehensive high school.

Collins Mound Site 
Consisting of 5 mounds within an 18-acre area located near the White River, this site has been dated to the Early to Middle Mississippian period (A.D. 900-1400.) Geometric surveys have hinted at the site being a complex prehistoric settlement associated with complex ritual mortuary events linking regional native populations.

Both rectangular and circular architectural structures have been noted, including a possible central plaza space.

Notable people

Jim King, baseball player
Danny L. Patrick, former member of the Arkansas House of Representatives from Madison County; in later years, he farmed near Elkins.

See also

 White River Bridge at Elkins

References

External links
 City website
 Community website

Cities in Arkansas
Cities in Washington County, Arkansas
Northwest Arkansas
1964 establishments in Arkansas
Populated places established in 1964